Hertz Car Sales, a division of The Hertz Corporation, regulates the sales of certified used vehicles previously used in the Hertz car rental fleet. Hertz Car Sales is based out of The Hertz Corporation's headquarters in Estero, Florida. The largest operating market is in North America, with over 68 dealer locations in the United States, with additional locations in France, Germany, Italy, Spain, and the United Kingdom.

History
In November 2014, it was announced that Tyler Best would act as chief information officer and Thomas Sabatino would take over as chief administrative officer. On January 2, 2017, Kathryn V. Marinello was appointed as President and CEO of The Hertz Corporation, including Hertz Car Sales. As of 18 May 2020, Paul Stone is the CEO of The Hertz Corporation. On, Oct 5, 2021 Hertz released that Mark Fields will be the interim CEO and Paul Stone as president and chief operations officer.

Locations
Hertz Car Sales operates in select countries worldwide and through Hertz licensees.

North America operations: 
 Hertz Car Sales maintains 68 retail locations across the United States. 
 Hertz Dealer Direct is available nationwide in the United States and Canada.

Fleet

Hertz Car Sales has developed a variety of ways to sell its fleet to businesses and consumers. The core methods used to facilitate these transactions are:
 Hertz Dealer Direct – A B2B platform developed by Hertz that allows for sales and services directly to automobile dealerships through an online portal and hertz representatives. 
 Hertz Rent2Buy Program – An online platform that allows consumers to reserve active rental vehicles for a test drive for up to 3 days at a low rental rate. If a purchase is finalized, fees are waived.  
 Hertz Car Sales Locations – Brick and mortar locations opened by Hertz that carry grounded rental vehicles that have been certified by Hertz and are available for purchase.

References

External links
Official website
The Hertz Corporation web site

The Carlyle Group companies
American companies established in 1977
Retail companies established in 1977
Auto dealerships of the United States
Companies based in Oklahoma City
Companies based in Bergen County, New Jersey
Park Ridge, New Jersey
Private equity portfolio companies
Companies based in Chicago
1977 establishments in New Jersey
Companies that filed for Chapter 11 bankruptcy in 2020